Latisipho hypolispus is a species of sea snail, a marine gastropod mollusk in the family Buccinidae, the true whelks.

Description
(Original description as Chrysodomus (Sipho) hypolispus)The length of the brown, polished shell attains 55 mm. It has well rounded six or seven whorls sculptured only by a few obsolete spirals and malleations. The axial sculpture consists of a few incremental lines. The suture is distinct. andThe spire is rather acute. The siphonal canal is very short and strongly recurved, axis almost pervious. The  outer lip is sinuous, throat white. There is a well marked callus ou the columella and body.

Distribution
This species occurs in the Bering Sea, Okhotsk Sea and Chukchi Sea.

References

External links
  Kosyan, A. R. "Anatomy and taxonomic composition of the genus Latisipho Dall (Gastropoda: Buccinidae) from the Russian waters." Ruthenica 16.1-2 (2006): 17-42.

Buccinidae
Gastropods described in 1891